Surapong Sripirom (born 31 March 1949) is a Thai boxer. He competed in the men's light flyweight event at the 1972 Summer Olympics.

References

1949 births
Living people
Surapong Sripirom
Surapong Sripirom
Boxers at the 1972 Summer Olympics
Place of birth missing (living people)
Asian Games medalists in boxing
Boxers at the 1970 Asian Games
Surapong Sripirom
Medalists at the 1970 Asian Games
Light-flyweight boxers
Surapong Sripirom